fMSX is a portable MSX emulator written by Marat Fayzullin. It is one of the earliest MSX emulators, and is also the most ported. fMSX is written in C with emphasis on portability. fMSX was a very influential and a number of emulators started as forks of fMSX, including blueMSX and paraMSX. The Z80 emulation code by Marat Fayzullin has been used on many other emulators.

References

External links 
 FMSX Homepage

Amiga emulation software
MSX emulators
GP2X emulation software